Tazeh Kand Rural District is in Khosrowshah District of Tabriz County, East Azerbaijan province, Iran. At the National Census of 2006, its population was 9,156 in 1,944 households. There were 10,011 inhabitants in 2,883 households at the following census of 2011. At the most recent census of 2016, the population of the rural district was 10,401 in 3,167 households. The largest of its seven villages was Akhuleh, with 2,826 people.

References 

Tabriz County

Rural Districts of East Azerbaijan Province

Populated places in East Azerbaijan Province

Populated places in Tabriz County